Haslingden Cricket Club is a cricket club in the Lancashire League, which plays its home games at Bentgate in Haslingden. For the 2020 and 2021 seasons its captain is Jordan Shannon. For the first time post war, the club did not employ a professional for the shortened 2020 season owing to the Coronavirus pandemic.  The club has won the league on 12 occasions and the cup on 5. It has employed professionals including George Headley, Clive Lloyd and Dennis Lillee. Another notable professional was West Indian opening batsman Phil Simmons. Ian Austin went on to have a successful career with Lancashire and England. Played for Haslingden as both an amateur and professional having started his career at Haslingden as a junior.

Honours
1st XI League Winners - 12 - 1900, 1920, 1953, 1983, 1985, 1987, 1988, 1989, 1991, 1993, 1997, 2004
Worsley Cup Winners - 5 - 1921, 1977, 1992, 1994, 1997
Inter League Club Challenge Trophy Winners - 2 - 1998, 2003
20/20 Cup - 1 - 2005
2nd XI League Winners - 17 - 1895, 1921, 1948, 1950, 1963 (shared), 1977, 1981, 1982, 1992, 1993, 1995, 1997, 1998, 2000, 2003, 2005, 2012
2nd XI (Lancashire Telegraph) Cup Winners - 7 - 1976, 1989, 1991, 1992, 1998, 2012, 2016
3rd XI League Winners - 4 - 2005, 2008, 2011, 2015

References

External links
Official site
Haslingden CC at lancashireleague.com

Lancashire League cricket clubs
Sport in the Borough of Rossendale